Jan Edbom (born 24 June 1957) is a Swedish former ice sledge hockey player. He won medals for Sweden at the 1994 Winter Paralympics and 1998 Winter Paralympics.

References

Living people
Paralympic sledge hockey players of Sweden
Swedish sledge hockey players
Paralympic bronze medalists for Sweden
Paralympic silver medalists for Sweden
1957 births
Paralympic gold medalists for Sweden
Medalists at the 1994 Winter Paralympics
Medalists at the 1998 Winter Paralympics
Paralympic medalists in sledge hockey
Ice sledge hockey players at the 1994 Winter Paralympics
Ice sledge hockey players at the 1998 Winter Paralympics
20th-century Swedish people
21st-century Swedish people